Lulu Qian is a Chinese-American biochemist who is a professor at the California Institute of Technology. Her research uses DNA-like molecules to build artificial machines.

Early life and education 
Qian is from China. She completed her bachelor's degree in biomedical engineering at Southeast University in Nanjing. Qian moved to Shanghai for her doctoral research, where she worked at Shanghai Jiao Tong University on biochemistry. She then moved to the California Institute of Technology as a postdoctoral fellow. At Caltech, she worked alongside Erik Winfree on biochemical circuits. She used a reversible strand displacement process to create a simple DNA-based building block for a biochemical logic circuit.

Research and career 
Qian joined the faculty at Caltech in 2013. She was promoted to professor in 2019. Her research considers molecular robotics and the self-assembly of nanostructures from DNA. These molecular robots can explore biologically relevant surfaces at the nanoscale, picking up molecules and transporting them to specific locations. In 2011, she created the world's largest DNA circuit, which included over seventy DNA molecules.

Qian has also created complex DNA origami. She created two-dimensional images from DNA origami tiles. She used DNA to create an artificial neural network. The network consisted of a DNA gate architecture that can be scaled up into multi-layer circuits.

Awards and honors 
 2019 Foresight Institute Feynman Prize in nanotechnology 
 2023 Caltech Richard P. Feynman Prize for excellence in teaching

Selected publications

References 

Year of birth missing (living people)
Living people
Chinese emigrants to the United States
Southeast University alumni
Shanghai Jiao Tong University alumni
California Institute of Technology faculty
Women biochemists
21st-century American chemists
21st-century American women scientists
American biochemists